The following is a timeline of the history of the city of Rimini in the Emilia-Romagna region of Italy.

Prior to 20th century

 268 BCE - Ariminum becomes a Roman colony.
 27 BCE - Arch of Augustus erected.
 313 CE - Roman Catholic Diocese of Rimini established; Stemnio becomes bishop.
 538 - Rimini besieged by Goth forces.
 1157 - Rimini granted "right of self-government."
 1216 - Rimini "worsted by Cesena."
 1237 - Giovanni Malatesta becomes podesta.
 1295 - Malatesta da Verucchio becomes .
 1432 - Sigismondo Pandolfo Malatesta becomes lord of Rimini.
 1450 - Tempio Malatestiano (church) built (approximate date).
 1512 - Spaniards and the Swiss fought against the French at Ravenna.
 1528 
 Pope Clement VII becomes definite master of the town.
 End of 250 years of the rule over Rimini of the House of Malatesta.
 1619 - Biblioteca Civica Gambalunga (library) founded.
 1861 - Bologna–Ancona railway begins operating; Rimini railway station opens.
 1882 - "Technical school" established.
 1889 -  (railway) begins operating.

20th century

 1901 - Population: 46,801.
 1912
 Airport built.
 Libertas Rimini football club formed.
 1916 -  begins operating.
 1921 -  begins operating.
 1932 - Ferrovia Rimini-San Marino railway begins operating.
 1934 - Stadio Romeo Neri (stadium) opens.
 1939 - Trolleybuses in Rimini begin operating.
 1960 - 31 July: .
 1976 - October: National meeting of Lotta Continua held in Rimini.
 1992 -  (transit entity) formed.
 1993 -  newspaper begins publication.

21st century

 2011 - Andrea Gnassi becomes mayor.
 2013 - Population: 143,731.

See also
 
 List of mayors of Rimini
 List of lords of Rimini, 1295-1500 (in Italian)
 List of bishops of Rimini (in Italian)
  region

Timelines of other cities in the macroregion of Northeast Italy:(it)
 Emilia-Romagna region: Timeline of Bologna; Ferrara; Forlì; Modena; Parma; Piacenza; Ravenna; Reggio Emilia
 Friuli-Venezia Giulia region: Timeline of Trieste
 Trentino-South Tyrol region: Timeline of Trento
 Veneto region: Timeline of Padua; Treviso; Venice; Verona; Vicenza

References

Bibliography

in English

in Italian
 
 Grazia Gobbi, Paolo Sica. Le città nella storia d'Italia. Rimini, Roma, Laterza, 1982.
 Stefano Pivato. Sentimenti e quotidianità in una provincia in guerra. Rimini, 1940-1944 (Rimini: Maggioli, 1995)
 Oriana Maroni, Maria Luisa Stoppioni. Storia di Rimini, Cesena, Il Ponte Vecchio, 1997.

External links

 Archivio di Stato di Rimini (state archives)
 Items related to Rimini, various dates (via Europeana)
 Items related to Rimini, various dates (via Digital Public Library of America)

Rimini
Rimini
rimini